Chen County (Chen Xian) may refer to:

 Huaiyang County, Henan, China, formerly Chen County (陈县)
 Chenzhou, Hunan, China, formerly Chen County (郴县)